The 2018 Ipswich SuperSprint (formally known as 2018 Coates Hire Ipswich SuperSprint) was a motor racing event for the Supercars Championship, held on the weekend of 20–22 July 2018. The event was held at Queensland Raceway near Ipswich, Queensland and consisted of two races, 120 and 200 kilometres in length. It was the ninth event of sixteen in the 2018 Supercars Championship and hosted Races 19 and 20 of the season.

Results

Practice

Race 19

Qualifying 

 Notes
 – Chaz Mostert received a 3-place grid penalty for impeding Shane van Gisbergen in qualifying.

Race

Championship standings after Race 19 

Drivers' Championship standings

Teams Championship

 Note: Only the top five positions are included for both sets of standings.

Race 20

Qualifying

Race 

Notes
 – Cameron Waters received a 5-second post-race Time Penalty for Careless Driving, causing contact with Simona de Silvestro.
– Lee Holdsworth received a 15-second post-race Time Penalty for Careless Driving, causing contact with Simona de Silvestro.
– Kurt Kostecki received a 15-second Time Penalty for Careless Driving, causing contact with Tim Blanchard.

Championship standings after Race 20 

Drivers' Championship standings

Teams Championship

 Note: Only the top five positions are included for both sets of standings.

References

Ipswich SuperSprint
Ipswich SuperSprint